Some films produced in Norway in the 2020s:

2020s

References

External links
 Norwegian film at the Internet Movie Database

2020s
Lists of 2020s films
Films